This is a list of schools in Kirklees in the English county of West Yorkshire.

State-funded schools

Primary schools

All Hallows' CE Primary School, Almondbury
Ashbrow School, Huddersfield
Batley Grammar School, Batley
Batley Parish CE Junior and Infant School, Batley
Battyeford CE Primary School, Battyeford
Beaumont Primary Academy, Huddersfield
Berry Brow Infant School, Berry Brow
Birdsedge First School, Birdsedge
Birkby Infant School, Huddersfield
Birkby Junior School, Huddersfield
Birkenshaw CE Primary School, Birkenshaw
Birstall Primary Academy, Birstall
Boothroyd Primary Academy, Dewsbury
Brambles Primary Academy, Huddersfield
Brockholes CE Junior and Infant School, Brockholes
Bywell CE Junior School, Dewsbury
Carlinghow Academy, Batley
Carlton Junior and Infant School, Batley Carr
Christ Church CE Academy, Huddersfield
Clough Head Junior and Infant School, Golcar
Co-op Academy Smithies Moor, Heckmondwike
Crossley Fields Junior and Infant School, Mirfield
Crow Lane Primary School, Huddersfield
Crowlees CE Junior and Infant School, Mirfield
Cumberworth CE First School, Upper Cumberworth
Dalton School, Huddersfield
Denby CE First School, Upper Denby
Denby Dale First and Nursery School, Denby Dale
Diamond Wood Community Academy, Dewsbury
Earlsheaton Infant School, Dewsbury
East Bierley CE Primary School, East Bierley
Eastborough Junior and Infant School, Dewsbury
Emley First School, Emley
Farnley Tyas CE First School, Farnley Tyas
Field Lane Junior and Infant School, Batley
Fieldhead Primary Academy, Birstall
Fixby Junior and Infant School, Huddersfield
Flockton CE First School, Flockton
Golcar Junior and Infant School, Golcar
Gomersal Primary School, Gomersal
Gomersal St Mary's CE Primary School, Gomersal
Grange Moor Primary School, Grange Moor
Hade Edge Junior and Infant School, Hade Edge
Hanging Heaton CE Junior and Infant School, Hanging Heaton
Hartshead Junior and Infant School, Hartshead
Headfield CE Junior School, Dewsbury
Headlands CE Junior and Infant School, Liversedge
Healey Junior Infant and Nursery School, Batley
Heaton Avenue Primary Academy, Cleckheaton
Heckmondwike Primary School, Heckmondwike
Helme CE Academy, Helme
Hepworth Junior and Infant School, Hepworth
High Bank Junior and Infant School, Hightown
Highburton CE First School, Kirkburton
Hightown Junior and Infant School, Liversedge
Hill View Academy, Almondbury
Hillside Primary School, Newsome
Hinchliffe Mill Junior and Infant School, Holmbridge
Holme Junior and Infant School, Holme
Holmfirth Junior and Infant School, Holmfirth
Holy Spirit RC Primary Academy, Heckmondwike
Honley CE Junior and Infant School, Honley
Hopton Primary School, Lower Hopton
Howard Park Community School, Cleckheaton
Hyrstmount Junior School, Batley
Kaye's Academy, Clayton West
Kirkburton CE First School, Kirkburton
Kirkheaton Primary School, Kirkheaton
Lepton CE Primary Academy, Lepton
Lindley CE Infant School, Huddersfield
Lindley Junior School, Huddersfield
Linthwaite Ardron CE Junior and Infant School, Linthwaite
Linthwaite Clough Junior and Infant School, Linthwaite
Littletown Junior and Infant School, Liversedge
Lowerhouses CE Junior and Infant School, Huddersfield
Lydgate Junior and Infant School, Soothill
Manorfield Infant and Nursery School, Staincliffe
Marsden Infant and Nursery School, Marsden
Marsden Junior School, Marsden
Meltham CE Primary School, Meltham
Meltham Moor Primary School, Meltham
Mill Lane Primary School, Hanging Heaton
Millbridge Primary Academy, Liversedge
Moldgreen Community Primary School, Huddersfield
Moorlands Primary School, Huddersfield
Mount Pleasant Primary School, Huddersfield
Netherhall Learning Campus, Huddersfield
Netherthong Primary School, Netherthong
Netherton Infant School, Netherton
New Mill Infant School, New Mill
New Mill Junior School, New Mill
Newsome Junior School, Newsome
Nields Junior and Infant School, Slaithwaite
Norristhorpe Junior and Infant School, Norristhorpe
Oak CE Primary School, Huddersfield
Old Bank Academy, Mirfield
Orchard Primary Academy, Chickenley
Our Lady of Lourdes RC Primary Academy, Huddersfield
Overthorpe CE Academy, Thornhill
Paddock Junior and Infant School, Huddersfield
Park Road Junior and Infant School, Batley
Pentland Infant and Nursery School, Dewsbury
Purlwell Infant School, Batley
Ravensthorpe CE Junior School, Dewsbury
Reinwood Community Junior School, Huddersfield
Reinwood Infant School, Huddersfield
Roberttown CE Junior and Infant School, Roberttown
Rowley Lane Junior and Infant School, Lepton
Royds Hall Academy, Huddersfield
St Aidan's CE Academy, Skelmanthorpe
St John's CE Infant School, Dewsbury
St John's CE Junior and Infant School, Golcar
St Joseph's RC Primary Academy, Dewsbury
St Joseph's RC Primary Academy, Huddersfield
St Mary's RC Primary Academy, Batley
St Patrick's RC Primary Academy, Birstall
St Patrick's RC Primary Academy, Huddersfield
St Paulinus RC Primary Academy, Dewsbury
St Peter's CE Junior and Infant School, Birstall
St Thomas CE Primary School, Huddersfield
Savile Town CE Infant School, Dewsbury
Scapegoat Hill Junior and Infant School, Scapegoat Hill
Scholes Junior and Infant School, Scholes
Scholes Village Primary School, Scholes
Scissett CE Academy, Scissett
Shaw Cross Infant School, Dewsbury
Shelley First School, Shelley
Shepley First School, Shepley
Skelmanthorpe Academy, Skelmanthorpe
Slaithwaite CE Junior and Infant School, Slaithwaite
South Crosland CE Junior School, Netherton
Spring Grove Junior and Infant School, Huddersfield
Staincliffe CE Junior School, Staincliffe
Thornhill Junior and Infant School, Thornhill
Thornhill Lees CE Infant School, Dewsbury
Thurstonland Endowed First School, Thurstonland
Upperthong Junior and Infant School, Upperthong
Warwick Road Primary School, Batley
Wellhouse Junior and Infant School, Golcar
Westmoor Primary School, Dewsbury
Whitechapel CE Primary School, Cleckheaton
Wilberlee Junior and Infant School, Wilberlee
Windmill CE Primary School, Batley
Woodside Green Primary Academy, Huddersfield

Middle schools
Kirkburton Middle School, Kirkburton
Scissett Middle School, Scissett

Non-selective secondary schools

All Saints Catholic College, Huddersfield
Batley Girls' High School, Batley
Batley Grammar School, Batley
BBG Academy, Birkenshaw
Castle Hall Academy, Mirfield
Colne Valley High School, Linthwaite
Creative and Media Studio School, Huddersfield
Holmfirth High School, Thongsbridge
Honley High School, Honley
King James's School, Almondbury
Manor Croft Academy, Dewsbury
The Mirfield Free Grammar, Mirfield
Moor End Academy, Huddersfield
Netherhall Learning Campus, Huddersfield
Newsome Academy, Newsome
North Huddersfield Trust School, Huddersfield
Royds Hall Academy, Huddersfield
St John Fisher Catholic Voluntary Academy, Dewsbury
Salendine Nook High School, Huddersfield
Shelley College, Shelley
Spen Valley High School, Liversedge
Thornhill Community Academy, Thornhill
Upper Batley High School, Batley
Westborough High School, Dewsbury
Whitcliffe Mount School, Cleckheaton

Grammar schools
Heckmondwike Grammar School, Heckmondwike

Special and alternative schools

Castle Hill School, Newsome
Engage Academy, Batley
Ethos College, Dewsbury
Fairfield School, Heckmondwike
Joseph Norton Academy, Scissett
Ravenshall School, Dewsbury
Reach Academy, Batley
Southgate School, Almondbury
Woodley School, Huddersfield

Further education
Greenhead College
Huddersfield New College
Kirklees College

Independent schools

Primary and preparatory schools
Al-Furqaan Preparatory School, Dewsbury
Dale House School, Batley
The Mount School, Huddersfield
Paradise Primary School, Dewsbury

Senior and all-through schools
The Branch Christian School, Dewsbury
Cambridge Street School, Batley
Huddersfield Grammar School, Huddersfield
Madni Academy, Dewsbury
Rida Boys High School, Dewsbury
Rida Girls High School, Dewsbury

Special and alternative schools
Brian Jackson College, Heckmondwike
ES Independent School Kirklees, Huddersfield
Holly Bank School, Mirfield
Pivot Academy, Cleckheaton

Kirklees
Schools in Kirklees
Schools